This was the first edition of the tournament. Farrukh Dustov won the title by beating Saketh Myneni in the final, 6–4, 6–4.

Seeds

Draw

Finals

Top half

Bottom half

References
 Main Draw
 Qualifying Draw

Agri Challenger - Singles
Singles